Cecil Stuart Reginald Bevan (May 1, 1875  January 22, 1953) was a British stage and film actor.

Filmography

References

External links
 

British male film actors
British male stage actors